"Use Somebody" is a song recorded by the American rock group Kings of Leon. It was the second single from the band's fourth studio album Only by the Night, and it entered American and British charts in early October 2008, three weeks after the album release. The single was augmented with a music video released a month later.

The single received heavy airplay in Scandinavia, the Republic of Ireland, Germany, the United Kingdom and Australia, where it was number one on the Official Airplay Chart for six consecutive weeks. It was a huge success in the U.S., where it topped multiple airplay formats and reached number four on the Hot 100 and number one on the Pop Songs chart.

The song received positive reviews and won Grammy Awards for Record of the Year, Best Rock Performance by a Duo or Group with Vocal and Best Rock Song. It was also nominated for Song of the Year. ¨Use Somebody¨ is written in the key of C major.

Critical reception
The song has received generally positive reviews from music critics. Mikael Wood of Entertainment Weekly called "Use Somebody" a highlight of the album, describing the song as "a too-cool hipster's cry for comfort". Nick Levine of Digital Spy said, "With its Springsteen-style 'oooah-woooah's, gathering storm of guitars and lusty, longing vocals from Caleb Followill, it's nearly as infectious as 'Sex on Fire'." Gavin Haynes of NME praised the song as "easily the best 80's power ballad of 2008", but cautioned that the band "may be in danger of mistaking bluster for brilliance".

Chart performance
In the United States, "Use Somebody" became the band's mainstream breakthrough. Peaking at number four on the Hot 100, it gave the band their first top five hit there, and spent 57 weeks on the chart. On United States radio, the song was a multi-format smash, becoming just the fourth song in history to top the Mainstream Top 40, Adult Top 40, Alternative Songs, and Triple A charts. (Preceding it were "Slide" by the Goo Goo Dolls, "Every Morning" by Sugar Ray, and "Boulevard of Broken Dreams" by Green Day.) The song first reached number one on the Billboard Hot Modern Rock Tracks chart (now called the "Alternative" chart), their second of three consecutive singles to top that chart. "Use Somebody" also reached number one on the Adult Top 40 chart, and later topped the Mainstream Top 40 chart as well. It reached over four million downloads in the US by July 2013.

In the United Kingdom, "Use Somebody" peaked at number two on the UK Singles Chart and spent an unbroken 40 weeks on the chart, only dropping out due to the surge in sales of Michael Jackson titles immediately after his death; after an absence of just one week, it was back for another 20 weeks, peaking at number 25. It has reappeared on further occasions since, and has now spent 77 weeks on the top 75, making it the 14th longest runner of all time, six places behind "Sex on Fire" with its 90 weeks.

Music video
Directed by Sophie Muller, who also directed the video for "Sex on Fire" and would later direct "Radioactive", the video features tour footage of the band, in addition to Caleb singing while sitting on a sofa in a penthouse suite overlooking the New York City skyline at night.

Notable cover versions

The song has attracted many cover versions, with CBS affiliate Live 105 radio listing the top 10 covers and Stereogum website listing the top 15, both lists published in 2010.
 Pixie Lott performed a cover version of the song which peaked at number 41 on the UK Singles Chart, due to it being a B-side to her number one single "Mama Do (Uh Oh, Uh Oh)".
 Dutch singer Laura Jansen covered a piano ballad-version of "Use Somebody". The song debuted in the Dutch Top 40 chart. It entered the charts on the thirty-fifth spot but quickly rose towards number 14. Her cover was later remixed by Dutch DJ Armin van Buuren.
 English electronic music group Ultrabeat released their cover as a single in 2009. The song peaked at number 100 on the UK Singles Chart
 Scala & Kolacny Brothers covered the song with the all-girls choir for their album Circle. A video produced for their cover was nominated for an MTV Freshman Video Award.

Track listing
CD single
 "Use Somebody" – 3:51
 "Knocked Up" (Lykke Li vs. Rodeo Remix) – 5:34

iTunes exclusive EP
 "Use Somebody" – 3:51
 "Knocked Up" (Lykke Li vs. Rodeo Remix) – 5:34
 "Frontier City" – 3:36
 "The Bucket" (CSS Remix) – 3:43

Personnel
 Caleb Followill – lead vocals, rhythm guitar
 Nathan Followill – drums, backing vocals
 Matthew Followill – lead guitar, backing vocals
 Jared Followill – bass, backing vocals

Charts and certifications

Weekly charts

Year-end charts

Decade-end charts

All-time charts

Certifications

See also
 List of best-selling singles
 List of best-selling singles in the United States
 List of Billboard Mainstream Top 40 number-one songs of 2009
 List of Ultratop 50 number-one singles of 2009
 List of Billboard number-one alternative singles of the 2000s

References

External links

2000s ballads
2008 singles
Kings of Leon songs
Songs written by Caleb Followill
Songs written by Nathan Followill
Songs written by Jared Followill
Songs written by Matthew Followill
Ultratop 50 Singles (Flanders) number-one singles
Grammy Award for Record of the Year
Music videos directed by Sophie Muller
Rock ballads
Grammy Award for Best Rock Song
Maggie Rose songs
2008 songs
Song recordings produced by Jacquire King
RCA Records singles
Sony Music singles